Conus gradatus, common name the graduated cone, is a species of sea snail, a marine gastropod mollusk in the family Conidae, the cone snails, cone shells or cones.

These snails are predatory and venomous. They are capable of "stinging" humans.

The subspecies Conus gradatus thaanumi Schwengel, 1955i s a synonym of Conus recurvus Broderip, 1833

Description
The size of the shell varies between 25 mm and 60 mm.

Distribution
This marine species occurs in the Gulf of California, Western Mexico to Peru.

References

 Tenorio M.J., Tucker J.K. & Chaney H.W. (2012) The families Conilithidae and Conidae. The cones of the Eastern Pacific. In: G.T. Poppe & K. Groh (eds), A conchological iconography. Hackenheim: Conchbooks page(s): 55
 Puillandre N., Duda T.F., Meyer C., Olivera B.M. & Bouchet P. (2015). One, four or 100 genera? A new classification of the cone snails. Journal of Molluscan Studies. 81: 1-23

External links
 To World Register of Marine Species
 Cone Shells - Knights of the Sea
 

gradatus
Gastropods described in 1828